Suez SA (formerly Suez Environnement) is a French-based utility company which operates largely in the water and waste management sectors. The company has its head office in La Défense, Paris. In 2015, all the group's brands became SUEZ.

History 
Formerly an operating division of Suez, the company was spun out as a stand-alone entity as part of the merger to form GDF Suez (now Engie) on 22 July 2008. Engie remained the largest shareholder of the company with a 35% stake. On the stock market, Suez Environnement's share jumped 40% in value on its first day.

In April 2014, Suez Environnement signed 3 major water treatment contracts in India worth 61 million euros. In July 2015, the group Suez Environnement simplified its name to become Suez, after the group GDF-Suez changed its name to Engie, leaving the name Suez available again. In September 2015, Suez acquired Sembcorp's 40% stake in the companies' common joint-venture to provide water treatment and waste management in Australia.

On October 1, 2017, Suez bought the Water & Process Technologies unit from GE Power for 3.4 billion dollars  and formed a new business unit called Suez Water Technologies & Solutions. Suez shares are listed on the Euronext exchanges in Paris and Brussels.

On May 14, 2019, Bertrand Camus was appointed as chief executive officer of Suez.

On February 1, 2022, SUEZ begins a new chapter in its history with its acquisition by the Consortium of shareholders and the appointment of a new CEO, Sabrina Soussan.

As of August 1, Sabrina Soussan is appointed chairman and CEO of SUEZ.

Financial results
Financial results in millions of euros:

Company governance 
As of March 10, 2022, the executive committee is made up of:

 Sabrina Soussan, Chairman and chief executive officer
 Maximilien Pellegrini, Group Deputy CEO, in charge of France and Italy
 Frederick Jeske-Schoenhoven, Group SVP Strategy, Communication and Sustainable Development
 Thomas Devedjian, Group Chief Financial Officer
 Laurent-Guillaume Guerra, Group Chief Human Resources Officer
 Philippe Andrau, Group Legal Affairs Officer

Shareholder structure 
Breakdown of share capital as of February 1, 2022.

See also

References

External links 

Waste management companies of France
Water companies of France
French companies established in 2008
Waste companies established in 2008
French brands
Companies listed on Euronext Paris
Veolia